The Nikšić District ( / ) was a former district within Montenegro. The administrative centre of the Nikšić District was Nikšić.

Municipalities
The district encompassed the municipalities of:
Grahovo
Krstac
Nikšić
Plužine
Šavnik
Velimlje

Demographics

See also
Districts of Montenegro
Administrative divisions of Montenegro

Districts of Montenegro